Mohammad Rahbari (born 13 December 1991) is an Iranian fencer. He competed in the men's sabre and Men's team sabre events at the 2020 Summer Olympics in Tokyo 2021.

References

External links
 

1991 births
Living people
People from Rasht
Iranian male sabre fencers
Fencers at the 2020 Summer Olympics
Olympic fencers of Iran
Fencers at the 2014 Asian Games
Fencers at the 2018 Asian Games
Asian Games silver medalists for Iran
Asian Games medalists in fencing
Medalists at the 2014 Asian Games
Medalists at the 2018 Asian Games
Medalists at the 2017 Summer Universiade
Universiade bronze medalists for Iran
Universiade silver medalists for Iran
Universiade medalists in fencing
Sportspeople from Gilan province
21st-century Iranian people